The Tainter gate is a type of radial arm floodgate used in dams and canal locks to control water flow.  It is named for Wisconsin structural engineer Jeremiah Burnham Tainter. 

A side view of a Tainter gate resembles a slice of pie with the curved part of the piece facing the source or upper pool of water and the tip pointing toward the destination or lower pool. The curved face or skinplate of the gate takes the form of a wedge section of cylinder.  The straight sides of the pie shape, the trunnion arms, extend back from each end of the cylinder section and meet at a trunnion which serves as a pivot point when the gate rotates.

Pressure forces on a submerged body act perpendicular to the body's surface.  The design of the Tainter gate results in every pressure force acting through the centre of the imaginary circle of which the gate is a section, so that all resulting pressure force acts through the pivot point of the gate, making construction and design easier.

When a Tainter gate is closed, water bears on the convex (upstream) side. When the gate is rotated, the rush of water passing under the gate helps to open and close the gate. The rounded face, long radial arms and bearings allow it to close with less effort than a flat gate. Tainter gates are usually controlled from above with a chain/gearbox/electric motor assembly.

A critical factor in Tainter gate design is the amount of stress transferred from the skinplate through the radial arms and to the trunnion, with calculations pertaining to the resulting friction encountered when raising or lowering the gate. Some older systems have had to be modified to allow for frictional forces which the original design did not anticipate. In 1995, too much stress during an opening resulted in a gate failure at Folsom Dam in northern California.

The Tainter gate is used in water control dams and locks worldwide.  The Upper Mississippi River basin alone has 321 Tainter gates, and the Columbia River basin has 195. A Tainter gate is also used to divert the flow of water to San Fernando Power Plant on the Los Angeles Aqueduct. 

The Tainter gate was invented in 1886 by Jeremiah Burnham Tainter (1836–1920), an employee of lumber firm Knapp, Stout and Co., for use on the company's dam that forms Lake Menomin in the United States.

References

Structural engineering
Canals
Dams
Hydrology
Flood barriers